The 2019 Mobil 1 SportsCar Grand Prix was a sports car race sanctioned by the International Motor Sports Association (IMSA). The race was held at Canadian Tire Motorsport Park in Bowmanville, Ontario on July 7th, 2019. This race was the seventh round of the 2019 IMSA SportsCar Championship, and the third round of the 2019 WeatherTech Sprint Cup.

After a temporary red flag due to an incident involving the #50 Juncos Racing Cadillac, the race was won by the #77 team of Oliver Jarvis and Tristan Nunez. PR1 Mathiasen Motorsports secured their third consecutive victory in LMP2, while Earl Bamber and Laurens Vanthoor topped the GTLM class. In GTD, Turner Motorsport scored their first victory of the season.

Background
On July 3, 2019, IMSA released their latest technical bulletin announcing BoP for the event. Restrictions were left unchanged for the two prototype classes from the previous round at Watkins Glen International, while minor changes were made within the two GT classes. The lone modification in GTLM was a 10 kilogram weight increase for the Corvette, while victory at Watkins Glen led to a 20 kilogram weight increase for the Acura NSX. The only other change was a four liter fuel capacity increase for the Lexus RC F.

Colin Braun and Jon Bennett entered the race as defending winners.

Entries

A total of 34 cars took part in the event, split across four classes. 11 were entered in DPi, 2 in LMP2, 8 in GTLM, and 13 in GTD. In DPi, Victor Franzoni replaced René Binder in Juncos Racing's sprint race lineup, with no other changes to the class. A similar change was noted in LMP2, as Dalton Kellett replaced Gabriel Aubry for PR1 Mathiasen Motorsports. In GTLM, Tommy Milner was sidelined after suffering a hand injury at Watkins Glen, necessitating Marcel Fässler to step into the #4 Corvette. GTD featured wholescale changes, with two cars dropping out after the preliminary entry list had been released. The Audis of Moorespeed and Starworks Motorsport withdrew, with the former having suffered a shunt at Watkins Glen and the latter citing performance issues as the cause for withdrawal. Bia Figueiredo also replaced Christina Nielsen in the Meyer Shank Racing #57 entry.

Qualifying
Colin Braun claimed overall pole for the event for CORE Autosport.

Qualifying results

Results

References

External links

Mobil 1 SportsCar Grand Prix
Mobil 1 SportsCar Grand Prix
2019 in Canadian motorsport
Mobil 1 SportsCar Grand Prix
Grand Prix of Mosport